The second season of the Naruto: Shippuden anime series is directed by Hayato Date, and produced by Pierrot and TV Tokyo. They are based on Part II for Masashi Kishimoto's manga series. Titled , the season follows Naruto Uzumaki and his friends attempting to reason with Sasuke Uchiha. The second season aired from November 2007 to April 2008 on TV Tokyo. It was also released on DVD in Japan over five discs between April 8 and August 8, 2008 by Aniplex. 

Naruto Shippuden premiered in the United States in Disney XD in late 2009, with these episodes airing between April 2 and October 27, 2010. The season ran on Adult Swim's Toonami programming block from August 17, 2014 to February 8, 2015.

The season was collected in five DVD volumes by Viz Media from April 6 to August 10, 2010. It was also compiled in two DVD boxes alongside the first season's last episodes on August 3 and October 19, 2010. In the United Kingdom, Manga Entertainment released it in three volumes from October 10, 2010 to May 16, 2011, while it was also part of a DVD box released on March 7, 2011.

The season uses three musical themes for one opening theme and two ending themes. The opening theme for this season is "Distance" by Long Shot Party.


Episode list

Home releases

Japanese

English

References

General

 
 

Specific

2007 Japanese television seasons
2008 Japanese television seasons
Shippuden Season 02